Sylmar/San Fernando station is a Metrolink rail station located in Sylmar, California, (a neighborhood of Los Angeles in the San Fernando Valley) and adjacent to the city of San Fernando. It is served by Metrolink's Antelope Valley Line between Los Angeles Union Station and Lancaster.

It has been selected as the northern terminus of the planned East San Fernando Light Rail Transit Project line.

Connections
LADOT Commuter Express:  to  LAX and El Segundo 
LADOT DASH: Sylmar

References

External links

Metrolink stations in Los Angeles County, California
Public transportation in the San Fernando Valley
San Fernando, California
Sylmar, Los Angeles
Railway stations in the United States opened in 1994
1994 establishments in California
Future Los Angeles Metro Rail stations